The 2007 Nigerian Senate election in Delta State was held on 21 April 2007, to elect members of the Nigerian Senate to represent Delta State. James Manager representing Delta South and Adego Erhiawarie Eferakeya representing Delta Central won on the platform of Peoples Democratic Party, while Patrick Osakwe representing Delta North won on the platform of the Accord.

Overview

Summary

Results

Delta South 
The election was won by James Manager of the Peoples Democratic Party.

Delta Central 
The election was won by Adego Erhiawarie Eferakeya of the Peoples Democratic Party.

Delta North 
The election was won by Patrick Osakwe of the Accord.

References 

April 2007 events in Nigeria
Delta State Senate elections
DEl